The 1950 South Carolina Gamecocks football team was an American football team that represented the University of South Carolina as a member of the Southern Conference (SoCon) during the 1950 college football season. In their tenth season under head coach Rex Enright, the Gamecocks compiled an overall record of 3–4–2 with a mark of 2–4–1 in conference play, placing 12th in the SoCon.

Schedule

References

South Carolina
South Carolina Gamecocks football seasons
South Carolina Gamecocks football